Laurence William Lane Jr. (November 7, 1919 – July 31, 2010) was an American magazine publisher, diplomat, and philanthropist.

Early life and education
Lane was born November 7, 1919, to Laurence William Lane (1890 – February 20, 1967) and Ruth Bell. His father was known as "Larry", so he was generally called "Bill". In 1928, the family moved from Des Moines, Iowa where Larry Lane was advertising director for the Meredith Corporation (publisher of Better Homes and Gardens magazine) to California. The Lane family owned and published Sunset Magazine. Lane graduated from Palo Alto High School.

Bill Lane attended Pomona College before transferring to Stanford University to study Journalism. He was a member of the Stanford Chaparral. After graduating with a bachelor's degree from Stanford, he joined the US Navy during World War II.

Lane married Donna Jean Gimbel in 1955, they met while she was working as an interior designer in Chicago.

Career 
As their father phased himself out of the business, Bill took over the Sunset Magazine publishing and brother Melvin (1922–2007) managed the Sunset Books business.

Lane was the first mayor and one of the founders of Portola Valley, California in 1964. From 1975 to 1976, he served as US Ambassador-at-large and lived in  Japan. From 1985 to 1989, he was appointed US Ambassador to Australia and Nauru. Ronald Reagan knew Lane from their membership in the Los Rancheros Vistadores horseback riding club.

The Lane publishing business was sold to Time Warner in 1990. In March 1993 he was appointed an honorary officer of the Order of Australia for service to Australian-American relations.

In 1995, Lane was named Conservationist of the Year by the National Parks Conservation Association (NPCA).

In 2006, Lane received the American Academy for Park and Recreation Administration's Pugsley Medal in 2006 because of his contributions to parks and conservation with advocacy through his magazine, leadership positions on a host of national and regional boards and advisory committees, and personal philanthropy.

Philanthropy, death and legacy 
The Lane family were large donors to Stanford University including renovations in 1983 to the Palo Alto Stock Farm Horse Barn and after the 1989 Loma Prieta earthquake, for the reconstruction of the Stanford Memorial Church and other historic campus buildings. In 2005, a donation to Stanford University named the Center for the Study of the North American West department after the Lane family.

The Lanes sponsored an internship program starting in 2002, the Bill and Jean Lane Internship Endowment at the National Museum of Natural History of the Smithsonian Institution.

In 2005, Lane and his wife (who graduated from Northwestern University in 1952) funded the Jean Gimbel Lane Prize in Piano Performance. In 2015, an additional $5 million endowment to Northwestern University was announced.

With a large donation to the UC Santa Cruz Arboretum, the Lanes established the Jean and Bill Lane Botanical Library in 1994, a non-lending library focusing on South African, Australian, New Zealand, and California plants.

Bill and Jean Lane endowed the Lane Family Lectureship in Environmental Science at Washington State University. The lecture was inaugurated in 1993. With their son, Robert, a 1983 WSU graduate, they also created the Robert Lane Fellowship in Environmental Science to support graduate students studying environmental science at Washington State University.

Bill Lane died on July 31, 2010, at the age of 90. His wife, Jean Lane, died in Portola Valley on 18 November 2017, after a brief illness, at the age of 87. Together they were survived by their three children, two daughters Sharon Louise Lane and Brenda Lane Munks and a son Robert Laurence Lane.

References

External links
 
 
 

1919 births
2010 deaths
Businesspeople from Des Moines, Iowa
People from Portola Valley, California
American publishers (people)
Mayors of places in California
Ambassadors of the United States to Australia
Ambassadors of the United States to Nauru
Stanford University alumni
Deaths from respiratory failure
Honorary Officers of the Order of Australia
Palo Alto High School alumni
Pomona College alumni
20th-century American businesspeople
20th-century American diplomats